Dik Trom is a Dutch film from 2010 directed by Arne Toonen, based on the characters of the Dik Trom book series, although features a new story. The film released to theatres in the Netherlands on 24 November 2010.

References

External links
 

Dutch children's films
Dutch comedy films
Films set in the Netherlands
Films shot in the Netherlands
Films based on Dutch novels
2010 films
Films directed by Arne Toonen
2010s Dutch-language films